The La Ronge Ice Wolves are a Canadian junior "A" ice hockey team based in La Ronge, Saskatchewan. They play in the Saskatchewan Junior Hockey League and play their homes games at the Mel Hegland Uniplex, which has a seating capacity of 1,200.

History

Despite finishing fourth in their division and seventh overall in the league, the La Ronge Ice Wolves defeated the Humboldt Broncos, Flin Flon Bombers, Battlefords North Stars, and  Yorkton Terriers to clinch their first SJHL Credit Union Cup. Ice Wolves' forward Liam Brennan was named playoff MVP after scoring a hat-trick overtime goal winning the series. With the win, the Ice Wolves advanced to the ANAVET Cup, but had already guaranteed themselves a position in the 2010 Royal Bank Cup as their opponent, the Dauphin Kings of the Manitoba Junior Hockey League, were hosting the National Championship.  The Ice Wolves fell in five games to the Kings. The teams met again in the semi-finals of the RBC Cup, with the Kings defeating the Wolves 5–2 on home ice.

The Ice Wolves went into the 2011 SJHL playoffs as the top team in the league with 86 points and their first regular season points title in team history.  The Ice Wolves featured the top three scorers from the regular season in Travis Eggum (106), Marc-Andre Carré (106) and Doug Lindensmith (98).  After receiving a bye past the first round, La Ronge beat the Flin Flon Bombers in five games, the Melfort Mustangs in five games, and won their second consecutive SJHL championship in seven games over the Yorkton Terriers.  The Ice Wolves won the championship on home ice before a listed attendance of 1,339.  Ice Wolves defensemen Dayton Fossum and goaltender Joel Danyluk shared the playoff MVP.  The Ice Wolves again lost in the ANAVET Cup, falling in seven games to the Portage Terriers.

Season-by-season standings

Playoffs
2000 Lost Preliminary round robin
Third in round robin (0-4) vs. Notre Dame Hounds and Melville Millionaires
2005 Lost Semi-final
First in round robin (3-1) vs. Battlefords North Stars and Kindersley Klippers
La Ronge Ice Wolves defeated Melfort Mustangs 4-games-to-2
Battlefords North Stars defeated La Ronge Ice Wolves 4-games-to-3
2006 Lost Semi-final
Third in round robin (1-2-1) vs. Battlefords North Stars and Nipawin Hawks
La Ronge Ice Wolves defeated Nipawin Hawks 4-games-to-none
Battlefords North Stars defeated La Ronge Ice Wolves 4-games-to-none
2007 Lost Preliminary
Nipawin Hawks defeated La Ronge Ice Wolves 4-games-to-2
2008 Lost Preliminary
Nipawin Hawks defeated La Ronge Ice Wolves 4-games-to-2
2010 Won League, Lost Anavet Cup, Lost 2010 Royal Bank Cup semi-final
La Ronge Ice Wolves defeated Humboldt Broncos 3-games-to-none
La Ronge Ice Wolves defeated Flin Flon Bombers 4-games-to-2
La Ronge Ice Wolves defeated Battlefords North Stars 4-games-to-2
La Ronge Ice Wolves defeated Yorkton Terriers 4-games-to-2 SJHL CHAMPIONS
Dauphin Kings (MJHL) defeated La Ronge Ice Wolves 4-games-to-1
Fourth in 2010 Royal Bank Cup round robin (1-3)
Dauphin Kings (MJHL) defeated La Ronge Ice Wolves 6-2 in semi-final
2011 Won League, Lost Anavet Cup
La Ronge Ice Wolves defeated Flin Flon Bombers 4-games-to-1
La Ronge Ice Wolves defeated Melfort Mustangs 4-games-to-1
La Ronge Ice Wolves defeated Yorkton Terriers 4-games-to-3 SJHL CHAMPIONS
Portage Terriers (MJHL) defeated La Range Ice Wolves 4-games-to-3
2012 
Preliminary Round  La Ronge Ice Wolves defeated Flin Flon Bombers 3-games-to-0
Quarter-Finals Humboldt Broncos defeated La Ronge Ice Wolves 4-games-to-0 
2016
Preliminary Round  La Ronge Ice Wolves defeated Yorkton Terriers 3-games-to-0
Quarter-Finals Melfort Mustangs defeated La Ronge Ice Wolves 4-games-to-0

See also
 List of ice hockey teams in Saskatchewan

References

https://www.icewolves.ca - Official Website
https://www.icewolves.ca/page/show/634444-the-northerner-playoff-mvp-award - Awards List

Saskatchewan Junior Hockey League teams